"Rasputin" is a song by Germany-based pop and Eurodisco group Boney M. It was released on 28 August 1978 as the second single from their third studio album Nightflight to Venus (1978). Written by the group's creator Frank Farian, along with George Reyam and Fred Jay, it is a song about Grigori Rasputin, a friend and advisor of Tsar Nicholas II of Russia and his family during the early 20th century. The song describes Rasputin as a playboy, mystical healer, and political manipulator.

Composition

The core of the song tells of Rasputin's rise to prominence in the court of Nicholas II, referencing the hope held by Tsarina Alexandra Fyodorovna that Grigori Rasputin would heal her hemophiliac son, Tsarevich Alexei of Russia, and as such his appointment as Alexei's personal healer. Rasputin gained tremendous influence from this position, particularly with Alexandra. This is also retold in the song: "For the queen he was no wheeler dealer". It also claims that Rasputin was Alexandra's paramour: "Ra Ra Rasputin, lover of the Russian queen, there was a cat that really was gone". This was a widespread rumour in Rasputin's time, with which his political enemies intended to discredit him. It stemmed from Rasputin's closeness to the Tsarina. "Rasputin" starts to retell contemporary accounts of his powerful personality: "He was big and strong, in his eyes a flaming glow...""He could preach the bible like a preacher, full of ecstasy and fire..." The song depicts Rasputin as being extremely popular with the Russian elite, something that is historically supported: "to Moscow chicks he was such a lovely dear". The song also depicts Rasputin as being sexually promiscuous, another contemporary rumour: "..But he was real great when he had a girl to squeeze." "..though she'd heard the things he'd done..." "Russia's greatest love machine". The song claims that Rasputin's political power overshadowed that of the Tsar himself in "all affairs of state", which was one of the main arguments of his contemporary rivals. The bridge of the song states that when his purported sexual escapades and political acts became intolerable, "men of higher standing" plotted his downfall, although "the ladies begged" them not to. Although the song states "he was a brute", it claims that the ladies "just fell into his arms."
 

The end of the song recounts a modified version of a popular description of the events that culminated in Rasputin's assassination, as perpetrated by Felix Yusupov, Vladimir Purishkevich, and Dmitri Pavlovich, on 16 December 1916 (O.S.). The song accurately states that the conspirators asked him "Come to visit us", and then recounts a widely popular account of the assassination in Yusupov's estate: that Rasputin's assassins fatally shot him after he survived the poisoning of his wine.

While the song accurately re-tells many of the unfavorable contemporary rumours that damaged Rasputin's reputation and led to his assassination, there is no verifiable evidence to suggest that he had an affair with Alexandra. Frank Farian's American friend Bill Swisher, who was a soldier in Germany at the time, provides spoken vocals at the bridge in the form of a newsreader. Swisher has also guested on Boney M. singles such as "Ma Baker" and "El Lute".

AllMusic journalist Donald A. Guarisco described it as "a tribute to the legendary Russian historical figure that uses balalaikas to create its textured rhythm guitar hook." Its melody has been compared to that of the traditional Turkish song "Kâtibim", but the band denied any similarity.

Reception and legacy
The song rose to the top of the charts in Germany and Austria and went to No. 2 in the United Kingdom and Switzerland. It was also another No. 1 hit for Boney M. in Australia, giving them their second (and last) chart-topper in that country (the other one being "Rivers of Babylon").

AllMusic's Donald A. Guarisco called the track "the oddest and most unusual and interesting combination of musical elements" from Nightflight to Venus, then picked it as one of his "track picks" from the album.

Although the song was written and performed in English, with single German and Russian words – "But the kasatschok he danced really wunderbar!" – it enjoyed great popularity in the Soviet Union, and is credited with reviving the fame of Rasputin there. The song was omitted, however, from the Soviet pressing of the album and Boney M. were barred from performing the song during their ten performances in Moscow in December 1978. During their visit to Poland in 1979, the band performed the song despite being asked not to by government officials. The show in Sopot was broadcast on national TV the next day after the song was edited out of their performance, but it was broadcast on the radio live and in full.

The song has been covered by several other bands in varying musical styles. Finnish band Turisas recorded a folk metal version, while American band Boiled in Lead covered it as a folk punk song. The British comic book Nikolai Dante cited a lyric from the song for the title of its story called "Russia's Greatest Love Machine" in the 1997 issue of 2000 AD. The Washington, D.C.-based dance/rock band Ra Ra Rasputin takes its name from the song. A Spanish version by Fangoria was included on their compilation album Dilemas, amores y dramas (2003).

The song was featured extensively in a trailer for 2021's The King's Man entitled "Official Rasputin Dance Video." The video focused heavily on the character Rasputin, who is portrayed in the movie by  Welsh actor Rhys Ifans. The song does not appear in the final movie.

Versions
The album pressings of Nightflight to Venus feature the title track segued into "Rasputin". Initial LP pressings included the full-length, 6:26 version of "Rasputin", most notable for an instrumental interlude in the third verse between the lines "though he was a brute, they just fell into his arms" and "Then one night some men of higher standing ..." that was later cut out. The second LP pressing featured a 6:03 version, subsequent pressings a 5:51 version. Boney M.'s single edit is completely different from the edit used for Frank Farian's Gilla recording in German that followed in November 1978 (without success).

Release
The German and Benelux pressings were backed with "Painter Man"; for most other territories the B-side chosen was "Never Change Lovers in the Middle of the Night". The UK pressings had a 5:32 version; most countries faded it to 5:02, while the French Carrere Records release had a 4:45 version. In the United Kingdom, "Painter Man" was issued as an A-side single in February 1979, giving the group a No. 10 hit. In Canada, "Rasputin" was the A-side and became a major hit, topping the Canadian RPM magazine's Adult Contemporary singles chart for two weeks beginning 24 March 1979, and peaking at No. 7 on RPMs Top 100 pop singles chart that same week. Despite the Canadian success, the song failed to chart in the United States.

In late January 2021, over 40 years since it was released as a single, the song went viral on TikTok, also appearing on Spotify's "Viral Hits" playlist. The accompanying dance originated from the 2010 video game, Just Dance 2.

Charts

Weekly charts

Year-end charts

Sales and certifications

Covers
Turisas version

Finnish folk metal band Turisas recorded a cover of Rasputin, released on 21 September 2007 through Century Media. The band played the cover live for a few years and finally decided to record a studio version of it because of positive feedback from fans. A music video was shot as well.

Track listing
 "Rasputin" – 3:56
 "Battle Metal" – 4:23
A limited edition 7" picture vinyl features "The Court of Jarisleif" as the B-side.

Different regions contained different B-sides. Canadian, South American, Asian and some European releases featured "Never Change Lovers in the Middle of the Night," the US release featured "He Was a Steppenwolf." The Polish and Chilean releases featured "Night Flight to Venus" and remaining European releases featured "Painter Man" as the B-side.

iTunes edition:
 "Rasputin" – 3:53
 "Rasputin" (Heavy Demo Version) – 3:53
 "Rasputin" (Instrumental) – 3:51

Personnel
 Mathias Nygård – vocals, orchestral programming and keyboards
 Jussi Wickström – guitar
 Tude Lehtonen – drums and percussion
 Olli Vänskä – violin
 Hannes Horma – bass
 Lisko – accordion

Majestic version

On 26 February 2021, and after the resurgence of the song on TikTok, the North London DJ and producer Majestic released a revamped remix of the song credited to Majestic x Boney M. It has charted on the UK Singles Chart, US Billboard Hot Dance and Electronic Songs chart and across Europe. This version only contains lyrics from the first verse and first chorus of the original track.

Charts

Weekly charts

Year-end charts

Sales and certifications

Other versions
 Finnish punk rock band Sleepy Sleepers recorded a Finnish parody of "Rasputin" on their 1978 album The Mopott Show.
 Mona Carita covered the song in Finnish in 1979.
 American ska punk band We Are the Union did a cover of the song.

 Inspirations and use in other media 
"Rasputin" inspired multiple songs and has been featured in films and television programmes.

Jatin–Lalit sampled "Rasputin" for the song "Sachi Ye Kahani Hai" from Kabhi Haan Kabhi Naa (1994).

In the 2003 Malayalam film Balettan, the song "Baletta Baletta" was inspired by "Rasputin". The song was composed by M. Jayachandran.

The Thai version of song is ยิ่งเมายิ่งมัน''' (Ying Mao Ying Mun)  was sung by Suchart Thianthong in 2005 

The 2012 Indian film Agent Vinod feature a Hindi-language song titled "I'll Do the Talking Tonight" which features a similar tune to that of "Rasputin".

The song is heard in the 2022 Doctor Who special "The Power of the Doctor", in which the Master (Sacha Dhawan), posing as Rasputin, dances to it.

Since the Pandemic of Coronavirus in 2020 the song has been extremely popular by users of “Tiktok” who do the Rasputin Dance to it.

References

External links

 Top Ten Things About "Rasputin" By Boney M Stylus Magazine'', 31 October 2007.

1978 songs
1978 singles
2007 singles
2021 singles
Boney M. songs
Turisas songs
Number-one singles in Australia
Number-one singles in Austria
Number-one singles in Germany
Number-one singles in Poland
Ultratop 50 Singles (Flanders) number-one singles
Songs written by Frank Farian
Song recordings produced by Frank Farian
Songs about Russia
Songs about Grigori Rasputin
Sire Records singles
Atlantic Records singles
Hansa Records singles
Century Media Records singles